The handball competition at the 2009 Mediterranean Games took place from 26 June to 5 July 2009. Both the men's and the women's tournaments were contested by 9 teams.

Medal summary

Events

Medal table

Participating nations

Men

Women

References

Sports at the 2009 Mediterranean Games
Mediterranean Games
2009
International handball competitions hosted by Italy